Plectranthias takasei, the Hinomaru perchlet, is a fish of the family Serranidae, subfamily Anthiinae.

Distribution
The fish is found in Japan.

Size

References

takasei
Taxa named by Anthony C. Gill
Taxa named by Yi-Kai Tea
Taxa named by Hiroshi Senou